St. Sebastian's College is a  Catholic educational institution in Moratuwa, Sri Lanka, established in 1854.

The college enrolls over 4,000 students served by a staff of over 200. The college motto is "Exspecta Dominum Viriliter Age", meaning "Expect the Lord and act manfully" in Latin.

History

St. Sebastian's College opened in 1854 on the porch of St. Sebastian's Church, Moratuwa with 11 pupils, administrated by parish priest Friar Bondani, with the help of a Headmaster and his assistant. In 1863, it received endowments from Chevalier Jusey de Silva Deva Aditya, founding president of the church. The language of instruction was English. At the request of the Catholics of Moratuwa and the church authorities, the administration of the school was handed over to the De La Salle Brothers on 3 January 1926.

The last headmaster of the school was Lawrence Perera, and the first Brother Director was Irishman Brother Bonaventure Idus. The other two pioneers were a Frenchman, Brother Athanasius Charles and a Sri Lankan, Brother Glaster Oliver. The Rev. Brothers were provided accommodation at Chevalier Walauwa, the Moratuwa police station. Within a few months secondary classes began on the ground floor of the residence. The main school was situated at Uswatte Circular Road, opposite the engine shed of the Moratuwa Railway Station.

Senior Cambridge and Junior school certificate classes were organised and the school was registered as a secondary school in 1927. In 1930 Evelyn de Mel and Daisy Fernando, the daughters of H. Bastian Fernando, gifted 75 000 Sri Lankan rupees to the school.

Realising the necessity of rapid development, a  block of land at Uyana, Moratuwa was purchased for 30,000 rupees by obtaining a loan of 15,000 rupees from the Archbishop and a donation of 15,000 rupees from Bastian Fernando. The college commenced operations on the near site on 23 December 2004.

With the takeover of denominational schools by the government in 1960, St. Sebastian's College decided to continue as a no-fee private school. This was one of the most difficult periods in the history of the college and Rt. Rev. Bishop Edmund Fernando, then the parish priest of Moratuwa, organised the collection of funds for the maintenance of St. Sebastian's College and Our Lady of Victories convent, Moratuwa. Reverend Brother Modustus, an old boy of the college, was the college director in that turbulent period.

Benildus was the Principal of the College from 1964 to 1973. He managed fundraising projects and set up a welfare office to collect funds directly from parents. In 1974 the college faced another financial crisis and the president's counsel Eardley Perera formed the welfare society. They were responsible for maintaining St. Sebastian's College as a private school. The financial situation improved when in 1979 the government decided to give a grant to the non-fee levying private schools.

In 1989 principal, Brother Granville Perera started a large building project for the school and in two years sixteen primary classrooms were built. In March 1991 Brother Emmanuel Nicholas the Provincial Visitor introduced a Board of Governors as an advisory body to assist the administration of the college. President's counsel Eardley Perera was appointed as the Chairman of the Board of Governors. In June 1991 the Board of Governors established the School Development Society, to be in charge of financial management. With the cooperation of the Rev. Brothers and the Board of Governors the teachers, parents and the alumnae gathered round the college to build a three-storied classroom building and a main hall.

St. Sebastian's College entered a new era in 2003, when Brother Henry Dissanayake, the Provincial Visitor of the De La Salle Brothers, handed over the college to the Archbishop of Colombo from April 2003. The college is administrated by Fr. Bonnie Fernandupulle, Principal, Fr. Sylvester Ranasinghe, Deputy Principal, and Fr. Pradeep Fonseka, Principal Primary department.

Fernandupulle took over the Rectorship in 2003. The school functions as an 'assisted school" with substantial state funding. The school prepares students for Local Ordinary and Advanced Level examinations in Sinhalese and English.

College crest

 Top Left – Sword, arrows and the centurion's helmet The sword and arrows were used 
 Top Right – National Flag and Lion
 Bottom Left – signifies carpentry 
 Bottom Right – the Torch of Learning moral and physical education of children

Houses

Alban: Colour: green, white
Bonaventure: Colour: gold, white
De LaSalle: Colour: red, white
Luke: Colour: blue, white

Sports

Cricket

The Battle of the Golds is the annual cricket contest Big Match between St. Sebastian's College, Moratuwa and Prince of Wales' College, Moratuwa. In 2011 St. Sebastian's won the Battle of The Gold against Prince of Wales' College after 44 years.

Notable alumni

References

External links
St. Sebastian's College website
St. Sebastian's College, Old Boys Association, Sri Lanka Official Website
Board Of Prefects

1854 establishments in Ceylon
Educational institutions established in 1854
Catholic schools in Sri Lanka
Schools in Moratuwa
Boys' schools in Sri Lanka